The history of local government in London, England can be broken down into a number of periods.

Gallery

See also
Local government in London
History of local government in the United Kingdom
History of London

References

Further reading